Ghebī is a dialect of Hindko spoken in Punjab, Pakistan. In the early 20th century Grierson assigned it to his "North-Eastern Lahnda" group, whereas Shackle writing in 1980 placed it within Hindko "proper" alongside Chacchī and Avāṅkārī.

Ghebi is mainly spoken in Pindi Gheb and Fateh Jang Tehsils of Attock District and adjacent areas within Mianwali District and Chakwal District.

References

Bibliography 

Languages of Punjab, Pakistan
Punjabi dialects